Frank M. Gould was an American football coach.  He was the 11th head football coach at Wabash College in Crawfordsville, Indiana, serving for one season, in 1896, and compiling a record of 3–4.

Head coaching record

References

Year of birth missing
Year of death missing
Wabash Little Giants football coaches